Praiano is a town and comune of the province of Salerno in the Campania region of southwest Italy. It is situated on the Amalfi Coast (Costiera Amalfitana), a prime tourist location for the region and Italy alike, between the towns of Amalfi and Positano.

In 1997, the Amalfi Coast, including Praiano's "Vettica Maggiore" frazione was inscribed as UNESCO World Heritage Site. As of December 1, 2009, the town's population constitutes 2,069 inhabitants.

History

The town's name derives from the praia, or beach, from the Latin word pelagium, meaning "open sea." During the 10th-11th centuries, Praiano was once the summer residence of the doges of the Duchy of Amalfi.

During the Angevin period, a fortified tower, the Assiola, was constructed to defend the town. Praiano had an important local silk industry, however, it disappeared during the 19th century. With the discovery of corals in the vicinity around the 1800s, Praiano's economy was revitalized, mainly focusing on the fishing and tourism industries ever since.

Main sights

Attractions include the Church of San Luca Evangelista, dating back to 1123. On the inside, there are paintings by Renaissance painter Giovanni Bernardo Lama dating to the 16th century.  Another attraction is the Church of San Giovanni Battista, featuring a well-preserved maiolica tiled floor, dating back to the 12th-13th centuries.

See also
 Amalfi Coast
 Sorrentine Peninsula

References

External links

Cities and towns in Campania
Amalfi Coast